During the 2003–04 English football season, Blackburn Rovers competed in the FA Premier League (known as the FA Barclaycard Premiership for sponsorship reasons).

Season summary
Finishing sixth in the Premiership at the end of 2002–03 had booked Blackburn Rovers their second successive UEFA Cup campaign, but it was short-lived. A 5–1 opening-day victory against newly promoted Wolverhampton Wanderers kickstarted their new season, however, their overall Premiership form was far too dismal to give the side any hope of a third successive European qualification. Indeed, much of the season was spent battling against relegation; a decent finish to the season saw relegation fears eradicated by the end of April. Rovers finished 15th in the final table, putting intense pressure on manager Graeme Souness to turn things around.

Final league table

Players

First-team squad
Squad at end of season

Left club during season

Reserve squad
The following players did not appear for the first-team this season.

Statistics

Appearances and goals

|-
! colspan=14 style=background:#dcdcdc; text-align:center| Goalkeepers

|-
! colspan=14 style=background:#dcdcdc; text-align:center| Defenders

|-
! colspan=14 style=background:#dcdcdc; text-align:center| Midfielders

|-
! colspan=14 style=background:#dcdcdc; text-align:center| Forwards

|-
! colspan=14 style=background:#dcdcdc; text-align:center| Players transferred out during the season

Starting 11
Considering appearances in all competitions
 GK: #1,  Brad Friedel, 40
 RB: #2,  Lucas Neill, 33
 CB: #11,  Markus Babbel, 26
 CB: #6,  Craig Short, 26 (#15,  Andy Todd, has 21 starts)
 LB: #3,  Vratislav Greško, 26
 RM: #23,  Brett Emerton, 33
 CM: #8,  Tugay Kerimoğlu, 34
 CM: #7,  Garry Flitcroft, 31 (#24,  Barry Ferguson, has 15 starts)
 LM: #26,  Jonathan Douglas, 14
 CF: #9,  Andrew Cole, 29
 CF: #19,  Dwight Yorke, 17

Results

Premier League

Results by matchday

FA Cup

League Cup

UEFA Cup

Top scorers

Premiership
  Andy Cole 11
  Jon Stead 6
  Dwight Yorke 4
  Lorenzo Amoruso 3
  Markus Babbel 3

Notes

References

External links
FootballSquads – Blackburn Rovers – 2003/04

Blackburn Rovers F.C. seasons
Blackburn